Beaverdam Creek or Beaver Dam Creek may refer to:

Streams

Beaverdam Creek (Soque River tributary), a stream in Georgia
Beaverdam Creek (Wicomico County), a stream in Maryland
Beaverdam Creek (Little Black River tributary), a stream in Missouri
Beaverdam Creek (Salt River tributary), a stream in Missouri
Beaverdam Creek (South Fork Blackwater River tributary), a stream in Missouri
Beaverdam Brook (New Jersey), a tributary of Lawrence Brook
Beaverdam Creek (New York), converges with Fox Creek near Berne
Beaverdam Creek (Crabtree Creek tributary), a stream in Wake County, North Carolina
Beaverdam Creek (Lanes Creek tributary), a stream in Union County, North Carolina
Beaverdam Creek (Trent River tributary), a stream in Jones and Craven counties, North Carolina
Beaverdam Creek (Conewago Creek tributary), a stream in Pennsylvania
Beaver Dam Creek (South Dakota), a stream
Beaverdam Creek (Duck River tributary), a stream in Tennessee

Other uses
Beaverdam Creek Archaeological Site, in Elbert County, Georgia
Beaverdam Creek (conservation area), in Virginia and Tennessee
Battle of Beaver Dam Creek, in Hanover County, Virginia